The Vinobapuri metro station is located on the Pink Line of the Delhi Metro. The station was opened for public on 31 December 2018.

As part of Phase III of Delhi Metro, Vinobapuri is the metro station of the Pink Line.

The station

Station layout

Entry/Exit

Connections

Bus
Delhi Transport Corporation bus routes number 47A, 47ACL, 323, 400, 410, 410CL, 433CL, 433LnkSTL, 460CL, 542, 543A, 567, 611, 611A, 702, 711A, AC - Anand Vihar ISBT Terminal - Gurugram Bus Stand, AC-724A, Anand Vihar ISBT Terminal - Gurugram Bus Stand, CS-13A, CS-13B, TMS+Punjabi Bagh, serves the station.

See also

Delhi
List of Delhi Metro stations
Transport in Delhi
Delhi Metro Rail Corporation
Delhi Suburban Railway
Inner Ring Road, Delhi
Delhi Monorail
Delhi Transport Corporation
South Delhi
Lajpat Nagar
New Delhi
National Capital Region (India)
List of rapid transit systems
List of metro systems

References

External links

 Delhi Metro Rail Corporation Ltd. (Official site)
 Delhi Metro Annual Reports
 
 UrbanRail.Net – Descriptions of all metro systems in the world, each with a schematic map showing all stations.

Delhi Metro stations
Railway stations in South East Delhi district